Town Talk, originally T.V. Town Talk, was an Australian television series which aired on Sydney station TCN-9 during 1957, from circa May to December. Little information is available on this series. The series was hosted by early Australian television personality Robert Kennedy, who had been the original host of the Sydney version of What's My Line. Town Talk aired at 7:15PM on Fridays, following the evening news, which itself aired in a 15-minute time-slot during 1957.

References

External links

Nine Network original programming
1957 Australian television series debuts
1957 Australian television series endings
Black-and-white Australian television shows
English-language television shows
Australian television talk shows